Deathdrone 3 is a compilation album by Gnaw Their Tongues, independently released in 2007. The album comprises remixed recordings made during 2005 and 2006 that weren't compatible with the music of Spit at Me and Wreak Havoc on My Flesh and Horse Drawn Hearse. The compositions "Nihilism; Tied Up and Burning", "Anhedonia" (later re-titled "The Evening Wolves") and "Destroying Is Creating" later appeared on Gnaw Their Tongues' second full-length album Reeking Pained and Shuddering.

Track listing

Personnel
Adapted from the Deathdrone 3 liner notes.
 Maurice de Jong (as Mories) – vocals, instruments, recording, cover art

Release history

References

External links 
 Deathdrone 3 at Discogs (list of releases)

2007 compilation albums
Gnaw Their Tongues albums